Bartz is a German surname. Notable people with the surname include:

 Alexander Bartz (born 1984), German politician
 Carol Bartz (born 1948), American chief executive officer
 Gary Bartz (born 1940), American alto and soprano saxophonist
 Jenny Bartz (born 1955), American swimmer
 Julia Bartz (born 1984), German politician 
 Merlin Bartz (born 1961), American politician
 Randy Bartz (born 1968), American speed skater

See also 
 Bartz Klauser, character in the role-playing game Final Fantasy V
 Barz (disambiguation)

German-language surnames

de:Bartz